The 2009 U.S. Figure Skating Championships took place from January 18 to 25th 2009 at the Quicken Loans Arena in Cleveland, Ohio. Skaters competed in four disciplines – men's singles, ladies' singles, pair skating, and ice dancing – and across three levels: senior, junior, and novice. Medals were awarded in four colors: gold (first), silver (second), bronze (third), and pewter (fourth).

The event was used to determine the U.S. teams for the 2009 World Championships, 2009 Four Continents Championships, and 2009 World Junior Championships.

Qualifying
Qualification for the U.S. Championships began at one of nine regional competitions. The regions are New England, North Atlantic, South Atlantic, Upper Great Lakes, Eastern Great Lakes, Southwestern, Northwest Pacific, Central Pacific, and Southwest Pacific. The top four finishers in each regional advance to one of three sectional competitions (Eastern, Midwestern, and Pacific Coast). Skaters who placed in the top four at sectionals advanced to the U.S. Championships.

The top five finishers in each discipline from the previous year were given byes to the U.S. Championships, as were any skaters who qualify for the Junior or the Senior Grand Prix Final. Skaters were also given byes through a qualifying competition if they are assigned to an international event during the time that qualifying event was to take place. For example, if a skater competed at an event at the same time as his or her regional competition, that skater would receive a bye to sectionals. If a skater competed at an event at the same time as his or her sectional competition, that skater would qualify for the national event without having had to compete at a sectional championship.

Competition notes
 Reigning ice dancing champions Tanith Belbin / Benjamin Agosto withdrew before the event began due to injury to Agosto.
 2007 ladies' champion Kimberly Meissner withdrew before the event due to injury.
 Senior ladies Katrina Hacker and Mirai Nagasu both earned an overall score of 54.79 in the short program. The tie was broken by the technical elements mark, by which Hacker had beaten Nagasu by 2.05 points. Hacker therefore placed 5th while Nagasu placed 6th in that segment of the competition.
 Senior ladies Laney Diggs and Kristine Musademba tied for 10th place in the overall score. The tie was broken by the free skating segment and so Diggs placed ahead of Musademba overall.

Senior results

Men

Ladies

Pairs

Ice dancing

Junior results

Men

Ladies

Pairs

Ice dancing

Novice results

Men

Ladies

Pairs

Ice dancing

International team selections

World Championships

Four Continents Championships

World Junior Championships

References

External links
 2009 U.S. Figure Skating Championships Results
 U.S. Figure Skating Announces World, Four Continents and World Junior Teams
 Official website
 

United States Figure Skating Championships
U.S. Figure Skating Championships
Figure skating
United States Figure Skating Championships
Sports competitions in Cleveland
January 2009 sports events in the United States